Chris Foster may refer to:

Chris Foster (soccer), American soccer player
Chris Foster (folk singer) (born 1948), English folk singer and guitarist

See also
Christopher Foster (disambiguation)